Scott Horton may refer to:

Scott Horton (attorney), human-rights attorney and journalist
Scott Horton (radio host), libertarian activist, author, and host of Antiwar Radio

See also
 Scott Houghton (born 1971), English former footballer